Macurdy is a surname. Notable people with the name include:

Grace Macurdy (1866–1946), American classicist
John Macurdy (1929–2020), American operatic singer

See also
MacCurdy 
McCurdy (surname)

Patronymic surnames